This is a list of computer motherboard chipsets made by VIA Technologies. Northbridge chips are listed first, primarily by CPU-socket or CPU-family; southbridge chips are listed in a later table.

Background 
VIA chipsets support CPUs from Intel, AMD (e.g. the Athlon 64) and VIA themselves (e.g. the VIA C3 or C7). They support CPUs as old as the i386 in the early 1990s. In the early 2000s, their chipsets began to offer on-chip graphics support from VIA's joint venture with S3 Graphics beginning in 2001; this support continued into the early 2010s, with the release of the VX11H in August 2012.

VIA chipsets declined in popularity as other chipsets began to offer better performance, VIA entered other markets and Intel began to offer more powerful integrated graphics on their CPU dies.

Chipsets by CPU socket
The term V-Link indicates VIA's northbridge/southbridge interconnect bus.

Socket 3

Socket 5 and Socket 7
All chipsets listed support a maximum cache memory size of 2 MB and are PCI 2.1 compliant

 The only difference between the Apollo Master and the Apollo Master Plus is that the Plus does not support pipelined burst cache memory.
 The Apollo VP and Apollo VP2 chipsets were initially referenced by VIA as Apollo VP-1 and Apollo VP-2 respectively, later renamed to Apollo VP and Apollo VP2 when the "/97" upgrades became available.
 The Apollo VPX chipset is a low-cost solution that replaced the Apollo VP but with features similar to the VP2.
 AMD licensed the VIA Apollo VP2/97 core logic architecture for its AMD 640 chipset.

Socket 8, Slot 1 and Socket 370 

 ProSavage PM133 - graphics core from S3, derived from a combination of the 3D component of Savage4 and 2D from Savage 2000.
 PLE133 and PLE133T - graphics core from Trident, derived from Blade3D.
 CLE266 (Castle Rock) - graphics core from S3, derived from S3 Savage series under the brand name UniChrome.
 Asus advertised some boards as Apollo Pro 133Z.  133Z appears to be a late revision of or step up from 133A, but it is not listed on the VIA site.

Slot A and Socket A 

KT266 contains a hardware bug which causes system instability when using the AGP slot at the specified max capacity of 4×.
ProSavage KM133, KM133A, KM266, KM400, KM400A - Similar to the above, but with integrated graphics. After KM133, DDR is supported. The KM133 uses an IGP consisting of the S3 Savage4 3D core and Savage 2000 2D functionality. KM266's ProSavage8 IGP is similar but has an additional 3D pipeline. The KM400 chipset and its "A" variant use the VIA UniChrome IGP. KM400A supports FSB 400 unlike the KT400A
Later revisions of the KT333 (sometimes called KT333CF) are rebadged KT400 chips with AGP 8x disabled. On motherboards with this chipset AGP 2x cards which require 3.3V are not supported.
KT133E (= VT8363E + VT82C686B) appears on Gigabyte 7IXEH  but is not listed on the VIA site.  Based on the specifications of that motherboard, KT133E appears to be equivalent to (or a cost-reduced rehash of) KT133, supporting 133 MHz for memory but only 100 MHz for the CPU.
Some revisions of KT333 support 166 MHz FSB.

Socket 423, 478 and LGA 775

 Being a reduced version of PM880, PM800 is not as closely related to PT800 as P4M890 to PT890. Because of its high cost, It is soon obsoleted in favor of P4M800 and then P4M800 Pro, both of which have a lower rated V-Link and feature no special memory technology such as FastStream64 or StepUp that is common in the other listed 8xx chipsets.
 VIA PT890, P4M890, PT900, P4M900 – VIA's PCIe-only chipsets. The P4M chipsets have onboard graphics VIA UniChrome Pro.
VIA Chipsets P4 Series for Intel CPU Comparison Chart

Socket 754, 939, 940, AM2 

 VIA K8M890, K8T890, K8T900 – VIA's PCIe-only chipsets. 
The K8M800 chipsets has the onboard graphics VIA UniChrome Pro; the K8M890 has the Chrome9.
 The Athlon 64 chipsets do not have memory controllers, because memory controller is integrated into the CPU. Supported memory types depend on the CPU and socket used.
 VIA Chipsets K8 Series for AMD CPU Comparison Chart
 The K8M890 was also used on boards with Socket 754, like the ASUS K8V-VM Ultra

Chipsets supporting both VIA and Intel processors 

 VIA VX700 - Supports VIA C7-M or C7-ULV 533/400 MHz FSB
DDR2 533/400/333 or DDR400/333
Utilizes the VIA UniChrome Pro Integrated Graphics Processor (IGP)
VIA VN800 – Supports VIA C7-M / Intel Pentium M / Celeron M, and Yonah (Core Solo and Core Duo) Processors
VIA UniChrome Pro II Integrated Graphics Processor (200 MHz core clock)
DirectX 7
Support product: (VIA EPIA -VB6002G Mini-ITX Board)
 * - Cited in marketing literature as supporting up to 4GB DDR2 SDRAM; only supported up to 1GB DDR2 max actual per memory-slot. Motherboards with 1-slot support 1GB-max; motherboards with 2-slots support 2GB-max, etc.
VIA VN896 (Mobile) and VIA CN896 (Desktop). 
VIA VN896(Mobile) can support Intel Pentium M / Celeron M, Core Solo / Core Duo, and Core2 Duo Processors
Support product: (BenQ Joybook R42)
 VIA VX800
 First VIA mobile chipset to support DirectX 9.0 (Pixel Shader 2.0)
 VIA Chrome9 HC3 Integrated Graphics Processor (250 MHz engine clock, up to 256 MB frame buffer)
 Built-in VIA Vinyl HD Audio controller supporting up to eight high-definition channels with a 192 kHz sampling rate and 32-bit sample depth
 Supports 400/800 MHz FSB
 Supports up to 4 GB of RAM with two 64-bit DDR2-667 DIMMs
 Single-chip solution (no southbridge or V-Link required)
 Designed towards being used with the VIA Isaiah 64-bit processor.
 Maximum power consumption (TDP max) of 5 watts.
 VIA VX800U
 Similar to the VIA VX800
 VIA Chrome9 HC3 integrated graphics (166 MHz engine clock, up to 256 MB frame buffer)
 Supports a 400 MT/s FSB
 Supports up to 4GBs of RAM with two 64-bit DDR2-400 DIMMs
 Does not support PCIe or SATA due to their power requirements
 Maximum power consumption of 3.5 watts
 Intended for very low-power devices
 VIA VX855
 Full hardware acceleration of H.264, MPEG-2 and WMV9
 Single-chip solution (no southbridge or V-Link required)
Maximum power consumption of 2.3 watts
 VIA VN1000
DirectX 10.1
32 stream processors and 4 sampling units, supports Shader Model 4, OpenGL 3.0 and OpenCL 1.0 for GPGPU applications.
Acceleration of Blu-ray, MPEG-2, WMV-HD, VC-1 and H.264

Chipsets supporting VIA processors 

 VIA VX900
 Similar to VX855, but more expansion options
 VIA VX11/H
First VIA chipset built on the 40 nm CMOS process
Maximum power consumption of 5.8 watts
DDR3-1333 memory with maximum memory capacity of 16 GB
Integrated ChromotionTM 5.0 DX11 2D/3D graphics & video processor
DirectX 11, OpenGL 3.2.
Acceleration of Blu-ray, MPEG-2, WMV-HD, VC-1 and H.264
A card reader interface with support for MMC, MS Pro HG, and SDHC/SDXC

Southbridge chips 

 The SATALite interface allows for two additional SATA devices (4 total). It is required for RAID 0+1 on VT8237R Plus.
 The SATA-II feature of VT8237S is limited to 300 MB/S Data Transfer Rate bearing no NCQ functionality.
 Motherboards frequently had VIA companion chips for added functionality such as better audio (8 channel), more/faster USB (i.e. USB 2.0 for VT8233), or Gigabit Ethernet.
 8233: while AC97 could help offer a faux modem, this feature is not "on the board" and (some) boards did not come with a modem connector bought from store in box
 8233: manual does not mention 3com 10/100 at all and there is not connector - I believe the citation above to be possibly made by someone who does not have 8233

As a modular solution, the North and South Bridge of the VIA Apollo KT266A are completely pin compatible with current and future products, such as the VT8233C South Bridge with integrated 3Com Ethernet MAC.

Hardware bugs 
The KT133 chipset corrupted disk subsystems; specifically, the 686B Southbridge had issues with Creative's SBLive! sound cards. A BIOS update was released by VIA to fix this issue; however, it is not known if all motherboards with 686Bs had their BIOSes updated. The KT266 contains a hardware bug which can cause system instability when using the AGP slot at the 4× speed.

See also
 S3 Chrome
S3 Savage
Comparison of AMD chipsets
 Comparison of ATI chipsets
 List of Intel chipsets
 Comparison of Nvidia chipsets

References

External links 
 VIA's chipsets list

VIA
VIA Technologies
VIA Technologies chipsets